Rešice is a municipality and village in Znojmo District in the South Moravian Region of the Czech Republic. It has about 300 inhabitants.

Notable people
Adolf Opálka (1915–1942), soldier and resistance fighter

References

External links

 

Villages in Znojmo District